The 2013 Three Days of De Panne was the 37th edition of the Three Days of De Panne, an annual bicycle stage race. Taking part in and around the De Panne region of West Flanders, it began in Middelkerke on 26 March and was finished in De Panne two days later. It was part of the 2013 UCI Europe Tour and was rated as a 2.HC event.

Teams
23 teams were invited to participate in the tour: 10 UCI ProTeams, 11 UCI Professional Continental Teams and 2 UCI Continental Teams.

Race overview

Stages

Stage 1
26 March 2013 – Middelkerke to Zottegem,

Stage 2
27 March 2013 – Oudenaarde to Koksijde,

Stage 3a
28 March 2013 – De Panne to De Panne,

Stage 3b
28 March 2013 – De Panne to Koksijde to De Panne,  individual time trial (ITT)

Classification leadership

Notes
 In stage 2, Arnaud Démare, who was second in the points classification, wore the green jersey, because Peter Sagan (in first place) wore the white jersey as leader of the general classification during that stage.
 In stage 3a, Alexander Kristoff, who was second in the points classification, wore the green jersey, because Arnaud Démare (in first place) wore the white jersey as leader of the general classification during that stage.

References
General

Specific

External links

Three Days of Bruges–De Panne
Three
Three Days of De Panne